Brandon Silverstein is an American entrepreneur and entertainment industry executive. He is the founder and CEO of S10 Entertainment, a record label, artist management, music publishing, film, and investment company.

Career
While in high school in Tenafly, New Jersey, Silverstein created and promoted independent parties and events in New York City in addition to booking talent for Noah Tepperberg's clubs. As a freshman at Indiana University, Silverstein co-founded a music festival with the first iterations taking place on a farm with Avicii and Tiesto headlining. In his senior year, Silverstein dropped out of college to pursue his interest in music management. He returned to New York where a meeting with Jay Z and Jay Brown, the co-founder and CEO of Roc Nation, led him to found his own company: S10 Entertainment & Media.  Roc Nation and S10 formed a partnership in 2018.

Silverstein's first client was a member of Fifth Harmony, Normani, who signed with Silverstein to develop her solo career. He signed a worldwide management deal with Anitta in 2019. In 2020 he launched S10 Publishing, shortly thereafter announcing partnership deals with Ryan Tedder and Avex.

Silverstein was named to the Forbes "30 Under 30" in 2019 and the  Billboard "40 Under 40" in both 2020 and 2021. In 2021, he appeared on the Variety list of Hollywood's new leaders.

References

External links

People from Tenafly, New Jersey
American business executives
American music publishers (people)
Indiana University alumni
1991 births
Living people